In Scotland, a wirry-cow  is a bugbear, goblin, ghost, ghoul or other frightful object. Sometimes the term is used for the Devil or a scarecrow.

The word was used by Sir Walter Scott in his novel Guy Mannering.

The word is derived by John Jamieson from worry (Modern Scots wirry), in its old sense of harassment in both English and Lowland Scots, from Old English  cognate with Dutch  and German ; and cowe, a hobgoblin, an object of terror.

Wirry appears in several other compound words such as wirry hen, a ruffianly character, a rogue; wirry-boggle, a rogue, a rascal; and wirry-carle, a snarling, ill-natured person, one who is dreaded as a bugbear.

References

Scottish folklore
Scots language
Scottish legendary creatures
Scottish words and phrases
Supernatural legends